Dana Moshkovitz Aaronson is an Israeli theoretical computer scientist whose research topics include approximation algorithms and probabilistically checkable proofs. She is an associate professor of computer science at the University of Texas at Austin.

Education and career
Moshkovitz completed her Ph.D. in 2008 at the Weizmann Institute of Science. Her dissertation, Two Query Probabilistic Checking of Proofs with Subconstant Error, was supervised by Ran Raz, and won the 2009 Haim Nessyahu Prize of the Israel Mathematical Union for the best mathematics dissertation in Israel.

After postdoctoral research at Princeton University and the Institute for Advanced Study, Moshkovitz became a faculty member at the Massachusetts Institute of Technology. She moved to the University of Texas as an associate professor in 2016.

Personal life
Moshkovitz is married to American theoretical computer scientist Scott Aaronson.

References

External links
Home page

Year of birth missing (living people)
Living people
Israeli computer scientists
Israeli women computer scientists
American computer scientists
American women computer scientists
Theoretical computer scientists
Weizmann Institute of Science alumni
Massachusetts Institute of Technology faculty
University of Texas at Austin faculty
American women academics
21st-century American women